Institute for Nuclear Research and Nuclear Energy (INRNE) of the Bulgarian Academy of Sciences is
the leading center for research and application of the nuclear physics in Bulgaria.

The research areas include:
 Theory of the elementary particles, string theory, theory of atomic nuclei, soliton interactions and quantum phenomena
 Experimental physics of the elementary particles
 Gamma-astrophysics at very high energies
 Nuclear reactions, structure of atomic nuclei
 Neutron interactions and cross sections, physics of the fission
 Reactor physics, nuclear energy and nuclear safety and security
 Dosimetry and radiation safety
 Monitoring and management of the environment, radioecology
 Radiochemistry, high precision analyses of substances, development and production of radioactive sources
 Nuclear and neutron methods for investigations of substances
 Nuclear instrument design and production

The institute's staff of about 320 (150 of them are scientific researchers) works in 16 laboratories, 2 scientific experimental facilities and 9 departments providing general support activities.

References

External links
 Institute for Nuclear Research and Nuclear Energy

Institutes of the Bulgarian Academy of Sciences
Nuclear research institutes